William Delbert Gann (June 6, 1878 – June 18, 1955) or WD Gann, was a finance trader who developed the technical analysis methods like the Gann angles and the Master Charts, where the latter is a collective name for his various tools like the Spiral Chart (also called the Square of Nine), the Hexagon Chart, and the Circle of 360. Gann market forecasting methods are purportedly based on geometry, astronomy, astrology, and ancient mathematics. Opinions are sharply divided on the value and relevance of his work. Gann authored a number of books and courses on shares and commodities trading.

Biography
Gann was born June 6, 1878, in Lufkin, Texas. His father was a cotton farmer. He started trading in 1902 when he was 24. He was believed to be a great student of the Bible, who believed that it was the greatest book ever written. He was also a 33rd degree Freemason of the Scottish Rite Order, to which some have attributed his knowledge of ancient mathematics, though he was also known to have studied the ancient Greek and Egyptian cultures.

Writing style 
Gann often wrote in an esoteric and indirect style that many found difficult to follow; it was supposed that he could be doing so deliberately to conceal his true method. For example, Patrick Mikula found that, in his course How to Make Profits Trading in Commodities, whenever Gann used the term "natural dates", he was indirectly referring to one of the following astrological phenomena:
 Double ingresses (when two or more planets, not counting the Moon, enter a new sign within two consecutive days)
 Stations (when a direct planet turns retrograde, or vice versa)
 Declination of the Moon at extreme
 Eclipses
Likewise, Henry W Steele demonstrates in a YouTube video that the numbers in Gann's work often refer to a different subject from what they appear on the surface. For example, on page one and two of Forty-Five Years in Wall Street, there is a paragraph describing the different stocks at different prices on 14 June 1949, but Steele discovered that those "prices" are actually astrological aspects appearing in the sky on that day.

However, in his private communication, Gann was much more direct and candid about his use of astrology. For example, in a private letter to a student, he openly demonstrated how he used planetary cycles to make predictions in the coffee market.

Trading techniques

Planetary configurations 
Even though it is often debated whether Gann used astrology to time the market, or resonant time cycles shared by the solar system and humanity (plants track the sun; men track the stars), it is found that many "natural dates" described in Gann's How to Make Profits Trading in Commodities coincided with recurring astrological themes. Below are some more examples in the wheat market in How to Make Profits Trading in Commodities. All the important tops and bottoms are associated with astrological patterns. Although the book was published in 1941, some dates mentioned (marked with *) were far into the future:

For instance, when discussing the first example above, there is a quote from p. 107: "1932 - December, low ... This was a decline ... from the high ... in December 1919; time, 156 months. Add this time to December 1932, and it will balance in December 1945, making this important." On the surface, it seems that Gann was talking about a fixed 156-month cycle. However, it turns out that all three dates coincided with a conjunction of the Sun and retrograde Mercury in the sign of Sagittarius.

Planetary combinations for different markets 
Financial astrologers believe that different commodities are affected by different planetary combinations. Inside Gann's How to Make Profits Trading in Commodities, the following associations could be identified: 
 Lard: Venus-Jupiter 
 Cotton: Sun-Mercury conjunctions 
 Corn: Venus-Saturn 
 Soybean: Mars-Jupiter 
 Wheat: Sun-Mercury conjunctions, Venus-Jupiter, and Venus-Uranus 
 Rye: Sun-Mercury conjunctions, Venus-Jupiter, Venus-Saturn, and Venus-Uranus

Planetary influences on the weather along the Mississippi 
Bonnie Lee Hill believes that Gann used astrological patterns to predict the weather in the area around the Mississippi River, and hence the price of most agricultural commodities. She thinks that Gann had hidden the rules inside his novel The Tunnel Thru the Air, and they are listed below:

Price-zodiac conversion 

One of the most controversial techniques that Gann used is that he converted the price directly to zodiac degrees. For example, if a commodity is trading at $120 per share, he would convert it to 120° of the zodiac, which is 0° Leo. If the price makes a major aspect (e.g. conjunction, trine, square, etc.), then it is believed that the price will reach a short-term top or bottom.

When a price, after converting into a degree in the longitude, is in aspect with the planets, the trend is likely to change. For example, in Mechanical Method and Trend Indicator, Gann drew attention to the price level (¢103) on 16 April 1925, "Apr 16 low 103, down 79 cents from 182 and nearing $1.00 per bushel, a natural support level—Time to watch for change in trend." Coincidentally, 103° (or 13° Cancer) was where the heliocentric Mars and Pluto were in conjunction on that day.

Gann also used scales other than 1 dollar or point per 1 degree. Two notable scales are $12 and $30 to one degree, because the two largest planets in the solar system, Jupiter and Saturn, take approximately 12 and 30 years to orbit the Sun respectively. Using $120 as an example again, it would become 10° and 4°, which are 10° and 4° Aries in terms of zodiac. Gann also uses a scale of $0.07 ($1/15) to 1 degree, which is based on the Earth's rotation in 24 hours (for 24 times 15° is 360°). Using $120 as an example, $120 times 15 will be 1800°, and when it is divided by 360°, the remainder is 0. Therefore, it will become 0° Aries in the zodiac.

Here is an example from a private letter to a client on the coffee market: 
 The high in the May Coffee Santos D on 19 March 1954 was 8729.
 Using a scale of one point to one degree, 8729° = 360° × 24 + 89°, and 89° is 29° Gemini. 
 Using a scale of 30 points to one degree, 8729°/30 = 291°, and 291° is 21° Capricorn. 
 Using a scale of 12 points to one degree, 8729°/12 = 727.5° = 360° × 2 + 7.5°, and 7.5° is 7°30' Aries. 
 Using a scale of one cent (100 points) to one degree, 8729°/100 = 87.29°, and 87.29° is 27°17' Gemini

Gann angles 

Gann described the use of angles in the stock market in The Basis of My Forecasting Method (1935). Calculating a Gann angle is equivalent to finding the derivative of a particular line on a chart in a simple way. Each geometrical angle (which is really a line extended into space) divides time and price into proportionate parts. The most important angle Gann called the 1x1 or the 45° angle, which he said represented one unit of price for one unit of time. When one draws a perfect square and then draw a diagonal line from one corner of the square to the other, it illustrates the concept of the 1x1 angle which moves up one point per day.

Here is an example from a private letter of Gann to a client on the coffee market:
 The high in the May Coffee Santos D on 19 March 1954 was 8729.
 The low on 16 April 1932 was 435. Counting backward from March 1954, 276 months has passed.
 Using 30 points per month, the 45° line is at 435 + 30 × 276 = 8715 
 If 8715 is used as a resistance, it was just 14 from the 8729 high. 
 The low on 1 Oct 1936 was 300. Counting backward from April 1954, 210 months has passed.
 Using 30 points per month, the 45° line is at 300 + 30 × 210 = 6600 
 Using 40 points per month, the 60° line is at 300 + 40 × 210 = 8700 
 If 8700 is used as a resistance, it was just 29 from the 8729 high.

The Spiral Chart and the Hexagon Chart

Overview of the Spiral Chart 

The Spiral Chart is a square matrix of consecutive natural numbers, in which the number 1 is in the central square, and other values spiral out from it. The direction of the spiral is in counterclockwise, because Gann liked to overlay astrological charts onto the Spiral Chart, and most astrological charts spin counterclockwise. It is worth noting that this chart is often mistakenly called the "Square of Nine" by modern traders, when the term was originally used by Gann to refer to another tool in his course.

For the Spiral Chart, it is found that Gann used the following directions to overlay planetary positions:
 The axis going from 1 to 2,11, 28, and so on are 0° or 0° Aries, the spring equinox (in the Northern Hemisphere, same for below).
 The axis going from 1 to 4, 15, 34 and so on are 90° or 0° Cancer, the summer solstice.
 The axis going from 1 to 6, 19, 40, 69 and so on are 180° or 0° Libra, the autumn equinox.
 The axis going from 1 to 8, 23, 46, 77, etc. is 270° or 0° Capricorn, the winter solstice.

On the eight cardinal angles (45° multiples), the sequence of numbers which would appear is given by:

Mathematical formula of the Spiral Chart 
To calculate the angle of a particular price on the Spiral Chart, there are two methods. The first method is simpler than the second one, but the result is only an approximation.

Anecdote 
On p. 69 of Gann's novel The Tunnel Thru the Air; Or, Looking back from 1940 (1927), the numbers "1940" and "69" lined up at the top of the page. Incidentally, the sequence 19, 40, 69 appeared on one of the cardinal axes of the Spiral Chart. It was also the page in which Gann proclaimed (through the protagonist) that he had found the secret of future cycles from the Holy Bible.

Overview of the Hexagon Chart 
Very similar to the Spiral Chart, the Hexagon Chart is also a matrix of consecutive natural numbers, but the difference is that it starts with 0 in the central point, and the numbers spiral out in the form of a hexagon instead a square. The spiral direction in Gann's original course is also counterclockwise, because of its astrological overlay. Mathematically, the numbers in each additional layer represent the hexagonal numbers, which are the number of distinct dots consisting of the outlines of regular hexagons.

Similarly, it is found that Gann used the following method to overlay planetary positions on the Hexagon Chart:

 The axis going from 0 to 1,11, 28, and so on are 60° or 0° Gemini.
 The axis going from 0 to 2, 10, 24, and so on are 120° or 0° Leo.
 The axis going from 0 to 3, 12, 27, and so on are 180° or 0° Libra.
 The axis going from 0 to 4, 14, 30, and so on are 240° or 0° Sagittarius.
 The axis going from 0 to 5, 16, 33, and so on are 300° or 0° Aquarius.
 The axis going from 0 to 6, 18, 36, and so on are 0° or 0° Aries.

Again, the above mathematical relationship could be demonstrated by this mathematical formula:

Mathematical formula of the Hexagon Chart 
Like the Spiral Chart, there are two methods of calculation.

Practical examples 

According to Patrick Mikula, the rule of using the Spiral Chart or the Hexagon Chart is as follows:

 Identify the planetary combination(s) which governs the price movements of the commodity. For example, as stated above, corn is sensitive to Venus and Saturn.
 Look for a date when the planetary combinations ruling the commodity makes a major astrological aspect, like opposition, trine and square.
 Overlay the Spiral or Hexagon Chart onto the horoscope in the following way:
 On the Spiral Chart, 0° Aries shall align with the axis of 1, 2, 11, 28, 53 and so on.
 On the Hexagon Chart, 0° Aries shall align with the axis of 0, 6, 18, 36, 60 and so on.
 Find the current price on the Spiral or Hexagon Chart. For example, $36 is roughly at 135° on the Spiral Chart, and at 0° on the Hexagon Chart.
 See if the price makes any aspect to the planetary combination:
 If the combination involves Jupiter, then compare the angle of the price to Jupiter;
 Else, compare to the outer planet of the two.
 In the case of Venus-Saturn, since Jupiter is not involved, the price is compared against Saturn.
 If the price makes an important aspect to Jupiter or the outer planet, then a turning point may have been reached.
 The important aspects in the Spiral Chart are the multiples of 45° and 120°, i.e. 0°, 45°, 90°, 120°, 135°, 180°, 225°, 240°, 270° and 315°.
 The important aspects in the Hexagon Chart are the multiples of 60° and 90°, i.e. 0°, 60°, 90°, 120°, 180°, 240°, 270° and 300°
 By repeated experimentation, the trader can determine which chart (Spiral or Hexagon) works better on which commodity, and so forth.

Here are a few actual trading examples in Corn given by Gann in How to Make Profits Trading in Commodities: A Study of the Commodity Market. As stated earlier, Gann thought that the price of corn was influenced by the aspects of Venus and Saturn, thus the angle of the price on the Hexagon Chart is compared against Saturn. Please note that the minimum fluctuation in corn futures is  cent.

Please note that the price-degree conversions are based Method 1 described in the previous section, instead of the exact graphical angles on the Hexagon Chart.

Eclipses 
There are two ways that Gann made use of eclipses. The first one is that, when a planet returns to its position during a recent eclipse, then trend is likely to change. The second way is that when a planet crosses an eclipse spot which happens during a market top or bottom, then the down or up move will accelerate.

Planetary averages 
Gann maintained two formulas for calculating planetary averages. The first one is called the Mean of Five (MOF), which is arithmetic mean of the geocentric and heliocentric longitudes of the outer five planets: Jupiter, Saturn, Uranus, Neptune and Pluto. The other is called the Cycle of Eight (COE), which include all eight planets in its calculation, using both geocentric and heliocentric longitudes (the Sun replaces the Earth in the geocentric calculation). He thinks that when these averaged values make an aspect to the price, it will create support or resistance.

Personal view on religion 

Even though Gann was thought to be "religious", a careful analysis of his writings finds that he did not agree with the conventional Christian teachings. On page 99 to 100 of his novel The Tunnel Thru the Air (1927), Gann revealed some of his personal beliefs towards religion through a conversation between the protagonist, Robert Gordon, and his mother:

"She talked to Robert of his future and told him she hoped he would be a preacher. Robert confided to her that he could never be an orthodox minister, for he could not preach and teach the things which the orthodox ministers were teaching. He did not believe in a personal devil or believe in Hell, but believed in a God of Love and Justice. He did not believe that God would inflict upon any of his children eternal punishment but thought that whatsoever a man soweth, that shall he also reap and that we receive our reward here upon earth.

"He told her that the Bible plainly said that the kingdom of heaven is within us and he believed it. If we kept our conscience clear and did unto others as we would like to have them do unto us, he believed we would find our heaven and our reward here upon earth. Said that times and conditions were changing rapidly; that the new inventions and discoveries caused men to think differently than in the old days; that the old religious ideas would pass away and give place to more liberal, advanced ideas. He hoped to live to see the day when men would not only be too proud to fight, but would be too full of love for their fellowman to settle disputes with the sword. This was God's plan and it would come to pass this way, and he believed that he could be a great power for peace and hoped to live to see a world of peace with all nations united under one kingdom and one God, the God of Love and Justice."

Twenty-three years later, on page 21 of his book The Magic Word (1950), he expressed similar ideas:

"The Bible is simple when rightly understood. It teaches the Divine Law, its uses and abuses. Whether a law is divine or natural, it is made plain that if you disobey the law, you must pay the penalty and if you obey or follow the law, your reward is certain."

"The Bible does not teach reward after death but promises reward or a reaping now while you are here on this earth. Jesus said, 'As ye sow, also shall ye reap.' He did not say 'after death' but here and now. Too many have preached that we should live a life of sacrifice here on earth and wait until after death to receive the reward. This is not what people want. They want something practical. They want to receive their reward here on earth. If they put forth the right effort, they want to know that they will receive the reward here on earth."

"All natural laws teach and prove that we do get our reward on this earth. Job obeyed the law and got twice as much as he had while he was still on earth. There is nothing in the Bible that says these laws will not work today and I shall prove by the Bible that they do."

Effectiveness 
Gann's students have stated that he left a fortune of $50 million (equivalent to $ million in ) that he built by following his methods, but evidence of such a fortune is lacking. Alexander Elder, in his book Trading for a Living, said "I interviewed W.D. Gann's son, an analyst for a Boston bank. He told me that his famous father could not support his family by trading but earned his living by writing and selling instructional courses. When W.D. Gann died in the 1950s, his estate, including his house, was valued at slightly over $100,000." Larry Williams, in the book The Right Stock at the Right Time, also stated he met W.D Gann's son. Larry Williams stated that John Gann said "He asked why if his dad was as good as everyone said, the son was still smiling and dialing calling up customers to trade". Larry Williams in the same book says "I also met F.B Thatcher who had been Gann's promoter and advance man who said that Gann was just a good promoter, not necessarily a good stock trader".

Bibliography
 Speculation A Profitable Profession (1910)
 Truth of The Stock Tape (1923)
 Tunnel Thru The Air (1927)
 Wall Street Stock Selector (1930)
 New Stock Trend Detector (1936)
 Face Facts America (1940)
 How to Make Profits in Commodities (1941)
 How to Make Profits Trading In Put And Call (1941)
 45 Years in Wall Street (1949)
 The Magic Word (1950)
 WD Gann Economic Forecaster (1954)

The following books are also believed to be written by W. D. Gann using a pseudonym:

 The Ancient Science of Numbers (1908) by Luo Clement
 Astrology and Stock Market Forecasting (1937) by Louise McWhirter

See also
Financial astrology

References

External links

Interview with W.D. Gann By Richard Wyckoff
A short video presentation on the life of W.D. Gann
"Extending The Frontiers Of Technical Analysis: The Application Of W D Gann's Forecasting Method To The Currency Markets" by James Smithson, Market Technician, no. 84, March 2018
"Rediscovering W. D. Gann's Method Of Forecasting The Financial Markets" by James Smithson, Market Technician, no. 80, February 2016
"Rediscovering Gann's Law Of Vibration" by James Smithson, The Trader's Journal, October 2008
Journal of Commerce article from January 15, 1921, describing the basis for Gann's forecasts
Eric's Research Gann Study- Hong Kong Gann Research
 Gann Calculator Gann's square of nine calculator

1878 births
1955 deaths
American stock traders
Technical analysts
American astrologers
American non-fiction writers
People from Lufkin, Texas